"Pointless Relationship" is the debut single of Australian actress Tammin from her first album, Whatever Will Be (2005). The song was co-written by Norwegian singer Marion Raven for her debut solo album but was given to Tammin instead. Released as a single on 15 November 2004, "Pointless Relationship" peaked at number five on the Australia ARIA Singles Chart, becoming Tammin's highest-charting single.

Background and release
It was announced by Tammin that she will be pursuing a career in music, with her debut single, "Pointless Relationship", being released on 15 November 2004. The single was planned for a UK release on 5 September 2005 and then 19 September 2005 but was cancelled due to Tammin being contracted to a movie, which failed to materialise.

Commercial performance
"Pointless Relationship" debuted at number seven on the Australian Singles Chart and peaked at number five the following week, spending a total of 15 weeks in the top 50. It was certified platinum for shipping over 70,000 units in Australia.

Track listing
Australian CD single
 "Pointless Relationship"
 "Tender"

Credits and personnel
Credits are lifted from the Whatever Will Be liner notes.

Studios
 Recorded at A Side Productions and Polar Studios (Stockholm, Sweden)
 Mixed at Khabang Studio (Stockholm, Sweden)
 Mastered at Sterling Sound (New York City)

Personnel

 Savan Kotecha – writing
 Per Magnusson – writing, keyboards, programming, production, arrangement
 David Kreuger – writing, programming, production, arrangement
 Marion Raven – writing
 Emil Heiling – backing vocals
 Esbjörn Öhrwall – guitars
 Tomas Lindberg – bass
 Magnus Persson – drums
 Fredrik Andersson – mixing, engineering
 Chris Gehringer – mastering

Charts

Weekly charts

Year-end charts

Certifications

Remixes
In 2005, Sony BMG commissioned remixes of "Pointless Relationship" for the UK release of the track. The remixes were done by Groovefinder and were sent out to radio stations. The Groovefinder Remix was to be included on the UK single but when the release was cancelled, remix promo CDs were withdrawn and the remixes remain officially unreleased.

References

Tammin Sursok songs
2004 debut singles
2004 songs
Columbia Records singles
Songs written by David Kreuger
Songs written by Marion Raven
Songs written by Per Magnusson
Songs written by Savan Kotecha